Following is a list of non-profit organizations operating in the American city of Jacksonville, Florida.

General category

Abuse
Hubbard House

Agency support
Alfred I. duPont Testamentary Trust
Amelia Island Concours d'Elegance Foundation
Community Foundation in Jacksonville
Jacksonville Jaguars Foundation
Jessie Ball duPont Fund
Tom Coughlin Jay Fund Foundation

Children's social services
Guardian Ad Litem Florida

Civic
Jacksonville Civic Council

Educational 
 City Year
 Jacksonville Public Education Fund
 Jacksonville University
 Teach for America
 The New Teacher Project
 Quality Education for All
 Generation

Environment
Duval Audubon Society
Jacksonville Arboretum & Gardens
North Florida Land Trust
The Nature Conservancy
St. Johns Riverkeeper
U.S. Green Building Council North Florida Chapter

Catholic Charities
Lutheran Social Services of Northeast Florida
Second Harvest North Florida Food Bank

Fraternal
Ancient Arabic Order of the Nobles of the Mystic Shrine
Benevolent and Protective Order of Elks
Fraternal Order of Eagles
Fraternal Order of Police
Gator Bowl Association
Kiwanis
Knights of Columbus
Lions Club International
Masons
Moose International
Optimist International
Rotary Club

Health related
Cystic Fibrosis Foundation
Yoga 4 Change
Life Renewed Counseling

Homeless
Clara White Mission
StandUp For Kids
Sulzbacher Center

Housing
HabiJax

Living/dying
Alfred I. duPont Testamentary Trust
American Red Cross of Northeast Florida
Community Hospice of Northeast Florida
Dreams Come True
Tom Coughlin Jay Fund Foundation

Medical
Baptist Health
Mayo Clinic Hospital
Nemours Children's Clinic
Planned Parenthood
St. Vincent's HealthCare
UF Health Jacksonville

Religious
Sidewalk Funday School

Social services
Alliance for the Lost Boys of Sudan Florida
Goodwill Industries of North Florida
Jacksonville Urban League
Personal Energy Transportation Florida
Salvation Army of Northeast Florida

Veterans
American Legion Post 137
 Veterans of Foreign Wars 
Wounded Warrior Project

Youth organizations
4-H of Duval County
Big Brothers Big Sisters of America Northeast Florida
Boselli Foundation
The Bridge of Northeast Florida
Cathedral Arts Project
Communities In Schools of Jacksonville
FreshMinistries
Girls Incorporated of Jacksonville
Junior Achievement of Florida's First Coast
MaliVai Washington Kids Foundation
Otis Smith Kids Foundation
Police Athletic League-Jacksonville
Young Life- Jacksonville

IRS reported
According to the TaxExemptWorld.com website, which compiles Internal Revenue Service data, in 2007 there are 2,910 distinct, active, tax exempt/non-profit organizations in Jacksonville, Florida, which, excluding credit unions, had a total income of $7.08 billion and assets of $9.54 billion. 
There are 333 charitable organizations with assets of over $1 million. The largest share of assets was tied to medical facilities, $4.5 billion.

Group classifications
1,814 Charitable Organizations
  836 Religious Organizations
  642 Educational Organizations
  144 Business Leagues
  114 Pleasure, Recreational, or Social Clubs
  108 Labor Organizations
   83 Social Welfare Organizations
   78 Civic Leagues
   73 Fraternal Beneficiary Society, Order or Associations
   58 Domestic Fraternal Societies and Associations
   42 Boards of Trade
   42 Posts or Organizations of War Veterans
   36 Private Foundations
   25 Title-Holding Corporations
   23 Voluntary Employees' Beneficiary Associations (Non-Govt. Emps.)
   17 Organizations to Prevent Cruelty to Animals
   12 Credit Unions
    8 Chambers of Commerce
    8 Literary Organizations
    7 Local Associations of Employees
    7 Cemetery/Burial Associations
    4 Mutual Insurance Companies or Assoc. Other Than Life or Marine
    2 Organizations for Public Safety Testing
    2 Scientific Organizations
    2 Agricultural Organizations
    2 Organizations to Prevent Cruelty to Children
    1 Real Estate Board
    1 Charitable Trust
    1 Cooperative Hospital Service Organization
    1 Voluntary Employees' Beneficiary Association (Govt. Emps.)
    1 Employment
As in most cities, there is a United Way of America affiliate to centralize fundraising efforts. United Way of Northeast Florida supports more than 50 major organizations.

Charitable organizations exceeding $1 million in assets in 2007

References

Lists of organizations based in the United States
Jacksonville, Florida-related lists